A chartist (also known as a technical trader or technical analyst) is one who utilizes charts to assess patterns of activity that might be helpful in making predictions.  Most commonly, chartists use technical analysis in the financial world to evaluate financial securities.  For example, a chartist may plot past values of stock prices in an attempt to denote a trend from which he or she might infer future stock prices.  The chartist's philosophy is that "history repeats itself". Technical analysis assumes that a stock's price reflects all that is known about a company at any given point in time.

See also 
Elliott wave principle
Efficient-market hypothesis
Professional designations:
Chartered Market Technician
Certified Financial Technician

References

External links
 Automated Technical Analysis Charting
 Chart Tool: Charting app for iOS
 ChartSecret.com: Trading Chart Patterns Tutorials
 The Chartist Chartists use different forms of technical analysis

Technical analysis
Computer occupations
Financial analysts
 Stock Trading Chart Patterns